Gadolinium(III) iodide is an iodide of gadolinium, with the chemical formula of GdI3. It is a yellow, highly hygroscopic solid with a bismuth(III) iodide-type crystal structure. In air, it quickly absorbs moisture and forms hydrates. The corresponding oxide iodide is also readily formed at elevated temperature.

Preparation 

Gadolinium(III) iodide can be obtained by reacting gadolinium with iodine:

2 Gd + 3 I2 → 2 GdI3

It can also be obtained by reacting gadolinium with mercury(II) iodide in a vacuum at 500 °C:

2 Gd + 3 HgI2 → 2 GdI3 + 3 Hg

Gadolinium(III) iodide can be obtained by the reaction between gadolinium(III) oxide and hydroiodic acid, crystallizing into the hydrate form. The hydrate form can be heated with ammonium iodide to form the anhydrous form.

 Gd2O3 + 6 HI → 2 GdI3 + 3 H2O

Reactions 

Gadolinium(III) iodide reacts with gadolinium and zinc in an argon atmosphere heated to 850 °C to obtain Gd7I12Zn. It reacts with gadolinium, carbon, and gadolinium nitride in a tantalum tube at 897 °C to obtain nitrocarbide Gd4I6CN.

References

External reading

Asprey, L. B.; Keenan, T. K.; Kruse, F. H. Preparation and crystal data for lanthanide and actinide triiodides. Inorg. Chem., 1964. 3 (8): 1137-1240

Gadolinium compounds
Iodides
Lanthanide halides